Band 4.1-like protein 3 is a protein that in humans is encoded by the EPB41L3 gene.

Interactions 

EPB41L3 has been shown to interact with YWHAB, YWHAH, YWHAG and Cell adhesion molecule 1.

References

Further reading

External links